is a small Aten asteroid that made a close approach of 0.54 lunar distances from Earth on January 9, 2017. It was the largest asteroid to pass less than 1 lunar distance from Earth since  on August 28, 2016. The Catalina Sky Survey observed it first on January 7, 2017, only two days before its closest approach. At its brightest,  reached apparent magnitude 12.2. Shortly after, it moved too close to the Sun to be seen by telescopes.

References

External links 
 Minor Planet Center flyby diagram
 Newfound Asteroid Gives Earth a Close Shave (space.com)
 Asteroid 2017 AG13 passed between the Earth and Moon and we hardly noticed, redorbit.com, April 17, 2018
 
 
 

Minor planet object articles (unnumbered)
Discoveries by the Catalina Sky Survey
20170109
20170107